Past lives is a reference to reincarnation.

Past Lives may also refer to:

Music 
 Past Lives (band), an American post-punk band

Albums 
 Past Lives – The Best of the RCA Years, a compilation by the British musical group Level 42, 2007
 Past Lives (Saccharine Trust album), 1989
 Past Lives (Black Sabbath album), 2002
 Past Lives (Against the Current album), 2018
 Past Lives (L.S. Dunes album), 2022

Songs 
 "Past Lives" (Kesha song), 2012
 "Past Lives" (Børns song), 2014
 "Past Lives" (Local Natives song), 2016

Other uses 
 Past Lives (comics), a comic book storyline based on the Buffy the Vampire Slayer television series
 Past Lives (film), 2023 film directed by Celine Song.

See also 
Past life (disambiguation)
Past life regression
Reincarnation (disambiguation)
Rebirth (disambiguation)